Microlarinus lareynii (commonly known as Puncturevine Seed Weevil) is a weevil of the family Curculionidae.  It is native to interior regions of Italy, France and Rajasthan in India.

Microlarinus lareynii feeds on the seeds of the puncturevine, Tribulus terrestris. Together with Microlarinus lypriformis, which feeds on the stems of the puncturevine, it has been introduced as a biological control agent in the United States of America and Canada.

References 

Beetles described in 1852
Biological pest control beetles
Insects used for control of invasive plants